Omar Hakim (born February 12, 1959) is an American drummer, producer, arranger and composer. His session work covers jazz, jazz fusion, and pop music. He has worked with Weather Report, David Bowie, Foo Fighters, Sting, Madonna, Dire Straits,  Bryan Ferry, Journey, Kate Bush, George Benson, Miles Davis, Daft Punk, Mariah Carey, The Pussycat Dolls, David Lee Roth, and Celine Dion.

Early life
Hakim was born in New York City on February 12, 1959. His father, Hasaan Hakim, was a trombonist. Omar started playing the drums at the age of five, and first performed in his father's band four or five years later.

Career

Hakim first came to major attention backing Carly Simon in 1980, and joined Weather Report in 1982. He played drums on David Bowie's most commercially successful album, 1983's Let's Dance, as well as the follow-up, Tonight, in 1984. Bowie described Hakim as "a fascinating drummer, with impeccable timing" and "always fresh in his approach".

In the mid-1980s, Hakim joined Dire Straits as drummer while recording their fifth album Brothers in Arms. Hakim temporarily replaced the band’s then-permanent drummer Terry Williams, when his performance was felt to be unsuitable for the desired sound of the album after most of the album tracks had been recorded. Hakim re-recorded all the drum tracks on the album in two days and then left for other commitments. Hakim and Williams are both credited on the album. Hakim was also part of the band for Sting's album The Dream of the Blue Turtles.

"By this time, Hakim was teaching himself to program drum machines, which put him in even greater demand as a pop, rock, and R&B session musician, and landed him work with Madonna." He kept working in jazz fusion, playing with Roy Ayers, George Benson, Miles Davis, Lee Ritenour, Joe Sample, David Sanborn, and John Scofield across the 1980s and 1990s. His debut album as leader, Rhythm Deep, was released in 1989, also featured his singing, and was nominated for a Grammy Award.

In the 1990s, Hakim developed further in electronic percussion, which gave him more opportunities as a session musician: he recorded with pop stars Mariah Carey, Celine Dion, and Jewel. His jazz career had faded by the mid-1990s. His second album as leader, The Groovesmith, was released in 2000.

On June 18, 2015, Journey announced that Hakim would replace longtime drummer Deen Castronovo on their North American tour after Castronovo was arrested for domestic violence in Salem, Oregon.

Hakim was featured on the cover of Modern Drummer in 2014, and was on the cover of DrumHead in 2017.

Hakim became the Chairman of the Percussion Department of Berklee College of Music in 2017, replacing the previous Department Chair, John Ramsey.

On September 3rd 2022 Omar appeared at the Taylor Hawkins Tribute Concert at Wembley Stadium performing on sets with Nile Rodgers, Josh Homme, Chris Chaney, Gaz Combes, Geddy Lee and Alex Lifeson of Rush, Paul McCartney, Chrissie Hynde and The Foo Fighters.

Television
Between 1988 and 1989 Hakim appeared regularly as the house band drummer in The Sunday Night Band during the first half season of the acclaimed music performance program Sunday Night on NBC late-night television. After being temporarily replaced by drummer J. T. Lewis for the remainder of that season, Hakim reappeared in the band for the second season in the fall of 1989, when the program returned under the new name Night Music.

Discography

As leader/co-leader
 Rhythm Deep (GRP, 1989)
 The Groovesmith (Oh Zone Entertainment, 2000)
 The Trio of OZ, The Trio of OZ (OZmosis, 2010)
 The Omar Hakim Experience, We are One (OZmosis, 2014)
 OZmosys, Eyes To The Future, Vol. 1 EP (OZmosis, 2019)

As a member
Great Jazz Trio
with Hank Jones and John Patitucci
 Stella by Starlight (Eighty-Eight's, 2006)
 July 5 th - Live at Birdland NY (Eighty-Eight's, 2007)
 July 6 th - Live at Birdland NY (Eighty-Eight's, 2007)

As sideman 

With Victor Bailey
 Bottom's Up (Atlantic, 1989)
 Low Blow (Zebra, 1999)
 That's Right! (ESC, 2001)

With David Bowie
 Let's Dance (EMI America, 1983)
 Tonight (EMI America, 1984)

With Jonathan Butler
 Deliverance (GRP, 1990)
 Heal Our Land (Jive, 1990)

With Mariah Carey
 Mariah Carey (Columbia, 1990)
 Merry Christmas (Columbia, 1994)

With Chic
 Live at the Budokan (Sumthing Else Music Works, 1999) – live
 In Japan (Charly, 2002) – compilation 
 A Night in Amsterdam (Universe Italy, 2006)

With Miles Davis
 Tutu (Warner Bros., 1986) – rec. 1985
 Music from Siesta (Warner Bros., 1987) – soundtrack
 Amandla (Warner Bros., 1989) – rec. 1988–89

With Dire Straits
 Brothers in Arms (Vertigo, 1985) drums on "Money for Nothing"
 Money for Nothing (Vertigo, 1988) – compilation 
 Sultans of Swing: The Very Best of Dire Straits (Mercury, 1998) – compilation 
 The Best of Dire Straits & Mark Knopfler: Private Investigations (Mercury,2005) – compilation

With George Benson
 In Your Eyes (Warner Bros., 1983)
 Love Remembers (Warner Bros., 1993)

With Najee
 Najee's Theme (Capitol, 1986)
 Tokyo Blue (Capitol, 1990)
 Just an Illusion (Capitol, 1992)
 Love Songs (Blue Note, 2000) – compilation
 Embrace (N-Coded, 2003)

With Lee Ritenour
 Festival (GRP, 1988)
 Larry & Lee (GRP, 1995)
 World of Brazil (GRP, 2005)

With Special EFX
 Confidential (GRP, 1989)
 Double Feature (GRP, 1988)
 Just Like Magic (GRP, 1990)
 Peace of the World (GRP, 1991)
 Genesis (Shanachie, 2013)

With Joe Sample
 Spellbound (Warner Bros., 1989)
 Ashes to Ashes (Warner Bros., 1990)

With Neal Schon
 Late Nite (Columbia, 1989)
 I on U (Favored Nations Entertainment, 2005)

With Sting
 The Dream of the Blue Turtles (1985)
 Bring on the Night (1986)

With Kazumi Watanabe
 1983: Mobo Vol. 1 (Gramavision, 1984)
 1983: Mobo Vol. 2 (Gramavision, 1984)

With Weather Report
 Procession (Columbia, 1983)
 Domino Theory (Columbia, 1984)
 Sportin' Life (Columbia, 1985)
 This Is This! (Columbia, 1986)
 Live and Unreleased (Columbia, 2002) – live rec. 1975–83
 Forecast: Tomorrow (Columbia, 2006) – compilation
 Live in Cologne 1983 (Art of Groove, 2011)[2CD] – live rec. 1983
Source:

With others
 Laurie Anderson, Homeland (Nonesuch, 2010) – rec. 2007–10
 Roy Ayers, Africa, Center of the World (Polydor, 1981)

 Philip Bailey, Inside Out (Columbia, 1986)
 Anita Baker, Giving You the Best That I Got (Elektra, 1988)
 Jay Beckenstein, Eye Contact (Windham Hill Jazz, 2000)
 Birdy, Fire Within (Atlantic, 2013)
 Richard Bona, Scenes from My Life (Columbia, 1999)
 Michael Brecker, Now You See It...Now You Don't (GRP, 1990)
 Bobby Broom, Clean Sweep (Arista GRP, 1981)
 Tom Browne, Love Approach (GRP, 1979)
 Kate Bush, Before the Dawn (Concord, 2016) – live rec. 2014
 Tracy Chapman, Matters of the Heart (Elektra, 1992)
 Judy Collins, Fires of Eden (Columbia, 1990)
 Céline Dion, Let's Talk About Love (Columbia, 1997)
 Jerry Douglas, Traveler (Membran, 2012)
 Urszula Dudziak, Sorrow Is Not Forever...But Love Is (Keytone, 1983)
 EOB, Earth (Capitol, 2020) – rec. 2012–20
 Gil Evans, Lunar Eclypse (New Tone, 1992) – rec.1981
 Julia Fordham, Julia Fordham (Circa, 1988)
 Peter Frampton, Premonition (Virgin, 1986)
 Bob Geldof, Deep in the Heart of Nowhere (Mercury, 1986)
 Tom Grant, In My Wildest Dreams (Verve Forecast, 1992)
 Dave Grusin, Migration (GRP, 1989)
 Sammy Hagar, I Never Said Goodbye (Geffen, 1987)
 Sophie B. Hawkins, Tongues and Tails (Columbia, 1992)
 Roger Hodgson, Hai Hai (A&M, 1987)
 Bruce Hornsby, Harbor Lights (RCA, 1993) – rec. 1992
 Mick Jagger, Primitive Cool (Columbia, 1987)
 Bob James, Ivory Coast (Warner Bros., 1988)

 Stanley Jordan, Magic Touch (Blue Note, 1985)
 Don Johnson, Heartbeat (Epic, 1986)
 Chaka Khan, ck (Warner Bros., 1988)
 Carole King, City Streets (Capitol, 1989)
 Dave Koz, Hello Tomorrow (Concord, 2010)
 Urban Knights, Urban Knights (GRP, 1995)
 Jennifer Lopez, The Reel Me (Epic, 2003)
 Darlene Love, Paint Another Picture (Columbia, 1990)
 Carmen Lundy, Old Devil Moon (JVC, 1997)
 Mike Mainieri, Live at Seventh Avenue South (NYC, 1996) – live
 Cheb Mami, Dellali (Virgin, 2001)
 Bobby McFerrin, Beyond Words (Blue Note, 2002)
 Al Di Meola, Kiss My Axe (Tomato, 1992)
 Marcus Miller, The Sun Don't Lie (PRA, 1993)
 Joan Osborne, Relish (Polydor, 1995)
 Michel Petrucciani, Playground (Blue Note, 1991)
 Daft Punk, Random Access Memories (Columbia, 2013) – rec. 2008–12
 The Rippingtons, Curves Ahead (GRP, 1991)
 Nelson Rangell, Truest Heart (GRP, 1993)
 Lionel Richie, Louder Than Words (Mercury, 1996)
 David Lee Roth, Diamond Dave (Magna Carta, 2003)
 David Sanborn, As We Speak (Warner Bros., 1981)
 John Scofield, Still Warm (Gramavision, 1986)
 Rob Thomas, ...Something to Be (Atlantic, 2005)
 Knut Værnes Trio, Updates (Curling Legs, 2018) – rec. 2017
 Grover Washington Jr., Soulful Strut (Columbia, 1996)
 Aziza Mustafa Zadeh, Dance of fire (Columbia, 1995)
 V.A., Celebrating the Music of Weather Report (Telarc, 2000)
Source:

References

External links 
 Official Site
 Drummerworld page
 Pearl Drum page
 Sting - "I Burn For You" (1985)
 Omar Hakim and the Buddy Rich Band - "Slo Funk" (1991)

1958 births
20th-century American drummers
American jazz drummers
American male drummers
American rock drummers
American session musicians
Chic (band) members
GRP Records artists
The High School of Music & Art alumni
Living people
Musicians from New York City
The Rippingtons members
Weather Report members
Jazz musicians from New York (state)
20th-century American male musicians
American male jazz musicians
African-American musicians